The 1897 Brown Bears football team represented Brown University during the 1897 college football season. Led by Wallace Moyle in his third and final season as head coach, Brown compiled a record of 7–4. The team's captain was Dave Fultz.

Schedule

References

Brown
Brown Bears football seasons
Brown Bears football